Charles Blair Macdonald (November 14, 1855 – April 21, 1939) was a major figure in early American golf. He built the first 18-hole course in the United States, was a driving force in the founding of the United States Golf Association, won the first U.S. Amateur championship, and later built some of the most influential golf courses in the United States, to the extent that he is considered the father of American golf course architecture. He is a member of the World Golf Hall of Fame.

Early years
Macdonald was born in Niagara Falls, Ontario, to naturalized American parents — a Scottish father and Canadian (part Mohawk) mother — and grew up in Chicago. In 1872 at age 16, he was sent to St Andrews University, and while there he took up playing golf with a vengeance. Tutored by Old Tom Morris, Macdonald soon became proficient enough that he played matches on the Old Course at St Andrews against several of the leading golfers of the day, including Young Tom Morris. Macdonald returned to Chicago in 1874 and became a successful stockbroker, but rarely played golf for the next 17 years (a period he termed the "Dark Ages").

United States Golf Association
In 1894, the Newport Country Club and Saint Andrew's Golf Club both held "national championship" tournaments. Macdonald finished second in both, and on both occasions he angrily denounced the manner in which each competition was held, with the result that both tournaments were declared unofficial. That fall, delegates from the Chicago Golf Club (including Macdonald), Saint Andrew's, The Country Club, Newport Country Club, and Shinnecock Hills Golf Club met in New York City to resolve the problem. The result was the formation of the United States Golf Association (USGA), which would administer the official championship. Macdonald was named Vice President of the organization. The first U.S. Amateur was held in 1895 at the Newport Country Club, and this time Macdonald won, beating Charles Sands 12 & 11 in the final (which is still the record winning margin).

Golf course architecture
By the late 1880s, a group of Scottish immigrants had brought the game to the New York City area, playing at the Saint Andrew's Golf Club. In 1892, Macdonald convinced several associates to begin playing. Shortly thereafter, he founded the Chicago Golf Club. At first, Macdonald built nine rudimentary holes in Downers Grove, Illinois; these nine holes comprised the first golf course west of the Allegheny Mountains. In 1893 he expanded the course to 18 holes, creating the first full-length course in the United States. Shortly thereafter, in 1894, the Chicago Golf Club decided to move to a permanent home in nearby Wheaton, Illinois. Macdonald built a new 18-hole course there, a layout which is still the club's home today and has hosted multiple U.S. Opens, routinely continuing to rank as one of the top 50 golf courses in the world (the original 1892 site is now the Downers Grove Golf Course). In 1895 he designed the first nine holes at Onwentsia Club of Lake Forest, Illinois.

In 1900, Macdonald left Chicago to live in New York, becoming a partner in the Wall Street brokerage firm of C.D. Barney (through mergers, now Morgan Stanley Wealth Management). With only a couple of exceptions, most golf courses in the U.S. at that time were laid out in rudimentary fashion, with little strategy required of the golfer. Macdonald, by virtue of his experiences at St Andrews and later trips to Great Britain, was determined (not immodestly) to build the most noteworthy course outside the British Isles. He searched Long Island for a suitable site to emulate the classic seaside links of Scotland, and eventually settled on a site in Southampton, New York (near Shinnecock Hills Golf Club) in 1906. He dubbed the Southampton home at 119 Whites Lane "Ballyshear" and the house was designed by F. Burrall Hoffman. The home was purchased by Michael Bloomberg in 2011.

In 1908, he organized a group of 70 founders to contribute $1,000 each, and the National Golf Links of America opened for play in 1909. Many of the holes were his versions of famous holes from British courses, a pattern he would repeat on later courses. Macdonald would tweak the course for the rest of his life, altering every hole somewhat over the next 30 years. The course hosted the inaugural Walker Cup in 1922, and is considered a landmark of golf architecture even today. In 2005, Golf Digest ranked it the #9 course in the United States.

With the National Golf Links course, Macdonald began collaborating with Seth Raynor, who would later become a famous golf architect (a term coined by Macdonald in about 1910) in his own right. The pair would collaborate on a number of courses over the years. These included the Old White Course at The Greenbrier (1914), St. Louis Country Club (1914), the Shinnecock Hills Golf Course (1916), the Yale University golf course (1926), and the Mid Ocean Club in Bermuda, a course conceived to escape the reach of Prohibition (1921). One of the most famous was the Lido Golf Club (1914), a course which took an enormous amount of effort to construct and had several unique holes, and was considered at least on par with the National Golf Links while it existed (a course by the same name exists near its location today, but it was built by Robert Trent Jones in 1947).

In 1928, Macdonald published his book Scotland's Gift: Golf, which covers the spread of golf (prominently featuring himself) in the United States from its beginnings in the early 1890s to 1927, when there were some 4,000 courses in the country. It devotes several chapters to four of his courses, and gives his design philosophy. He is often called the "Father of American Golf Architecture".

Macdonald's Template Hole Designs
MacDonald identified 21 different hole designs or templates from the greatest holes in the British Isles that would test a great player's game while allowing mediocre and poor players angles and options to score well. These template holes are typically pretty easy to identify after a little schooling.  While these holes are similar from course to course, they are not duplicates. Each hole was designed specifically for the site to create a unique twist for players. Several of MacDonald's classic templates are:
 Alps
 Double Plateau
 Road Hole
 Eden
 Biarritz
 Cape Hole
 Redan Hole
 Short Hole

Course listing
The list of courses that Macdonald either designed alone or co-designed are listed below. Some courses are defunct (Lido Golf Club), some have been substantially redesigned (Shinnecock Hills Golf Club), and others have not been substantially altered (St. Louis Country Club). 

Bermuda
Mid Ocean Club – Tuckers Town (1921)

Connecticut
Yale Golf Course – New Haven (1926)

Florida
Palm Beach Winter Golf Club (original)– Palm Beach  (1927)

Illinois
Downers Grove Golf Course – Downers Grove (1892)
Chicago Golf Club – Wheaton (1895)
Onwentsia Club – Lake Forest (1896)
Exmoor Country Club (first 9 holes) - Highland Park (1897)

Maryland
Gibson Island Club – Gibson Island (1922)

Missouri
St. Louis Country Club (1914)

New York
Blind Brook Club – Purchase (1915)
The Creek – Locust Valley (1925)
Deepdale Golf Club (original) – Manhasset (1924)
Lido Golf Club (original) – Lido Beach (1914)
National Golf Links of America – Southampton (1909)
North Shore Country Club – Glen Head NY  (1916)
Piping Rock Club – Locust Valley (1911)
Shinnecock Hills Golf Club (original) – Southampton (1916)
Sleepy Hollow Country Club (18 hole & 9 hole) – Scarborough (1914)

West Virginia
The Greenbrier, The Old White Course – White Sulphur Springs (1914)

Honors
In 2007, Macdonald was elected as a member of the World Golf Hall of Fame, in the Lifetime Achievement category.

Major championships

Amateur wins (1)

Results timeline

M = Medalist
WD = Withdrew
"T" indicates a tie for a place
DNQ = Did not qualify for match play portion
R256, R128, R64, R32, R16, QF, SF = Round in which player lost in match play.

Source for U.S. Open and U.S. Amateur: USGA Championship Database

Source for 1906 British Amateur: Golf, July 1906, pg. 29.

Further reading

References

External links

USGA Photo essay on Macdonald
Detailed look at the National Golf Links of America
Review of Evangelist of Golf

Alumni of the University of St Andrews
Amateur golfers
American male golfers
Canadian male golfers
Golf administrators
Golf course architects
Golf clubs and courses designed by Charles B. Macdonald
Golf writers and broadcasters
Golfers from Chicago
Golfing people from Ontario
Sportspeople from Niagara Falls, Ontario
Sportspeople from Chicago
Sportspeople from Wheaton, Illinois
World Golf Hall of Fame inductees
1855 births
1939 deaths